Shiloh House may refer to:

Shiloh House (Sulphur Springs, Arkansas), listed on the National Register of Historic Places (NRHP) in Benton County
Shiloh House (Zion, Illinois), NRHP-listed in Lake County
Shiloh House (Benton Harbor, Michigan), NRHP-listed in Berrien County
Shiloh Youth Revival Centers, a 1970's Jesus People communal movement with 175 associated "Shiloh Houses."

See also
Shiloh Church (disambiguation)
Shiloh Baptist Church (disambiguation)